Sașa may refer to the following rivers in Romania:

Sașa, a tributary of the Lotru in Vâlcea County
Șasa (river), a tributary of the Olteț in Vâlcea County
Sașa, a tributary of the Tismana in Gorj County
Sașa, a tributary of the Zlast in Gorj County